is the 14th studio album by Japanese entertainer Miho Nakayama. Released through King Records on June 10, 1992, it features the single "Mellow". The album was co-produced by Nakayama and recorded in Los Angeles. She wrote majority of the album's songs; both under her real name and her pseudonym . A limited edition release included a mini photo book featuring pictures taken during the Los Angeles recording sessions.

The album peaked at No. 3 on Oricon's albums chart. It also sold over 140,000 copies and was certified Gold by the RIAJ.

Track listing

Charts

Certification

References

External links
 
 
 

1992 albums
Miho Nakayama albums
Japanese-language albums
King Records (Japan) albums